Thornholme is a hamlet in the East Riding of Yorkshire, England. It lies on the A614 road.

It forms part of the civil parish of Burton Agnes.

References

External links

Villages in the East Riding of Yorkshire